Václav Kašlík (28 September 1917 – 4 June 1989) was a Czech composer, opera director and conductor, known for his operas, both on the stage and on television.

Biography
Kašlík was born in Poličná in Moravia, Austria-Hungary (now part of Valašské Meziříčí in the Czech Republic). He studied musicology at Prague University, and composition, conducting, and opera production at the Prague Conservatory. In 1940 he began working for Brno radio as a conductor, and made his debut as a director at the Prague National Theatre with Boleslav Vomáčka's The Watersprite. In 1945 he and Alois Hába founded on the grounds of the former Neues Deutsches Theater the Grand Opera of the Fifth of May (today the State Opera Prague).

In 1953 he returned to the Prague National Theatre, establishing international reputation as a director. His use of television, film, and projections brought him wide acclaim, particularly due to the collaboration with Josef Svoboda.

His compositions are colored by the folk music of Moravia and Moravian Wallachia, as well as jazz and pop music.

External links
 

1917 births
1989 deaths
Charles University alumni
Czech classical composers
Czech male classical composers
Czech conductors (music)
Male conductors (music)
Czech opera directors
Czech theatre directors
People from Valašské Meziříčí
20th-century conductors (music)
20th-century classical composers
20th-century Czech male musicians
Czechoslovak musicians